The Spanish Badminton Federation (FESBA) is the governing body for the sport of badminton in Spain. The organization hosts the annual Spanish International Badminton Tournament and has also hosted the 2001 and 2006 IBF World Championships.

As of 2020, the federation has 294 registered clubs and 9,546 federated badminton players.

Tournaments
 Spanish International Badminton Tournament (Spain International), first held in 1974.
 Spain Masters, a new tournament first held in 2018 and also part of BWF World Tour.

Presidents
Four presidents have served in the organization since 1986.

References

External links 
Official Site 

Badminton
National members of the Badminton World Federation
Badminton in Spain
1985 establishments in Spain